Ace is an album by Grateful Dead singer and guitarist Bob Weir.  His first solo album, it was released in 1972. Weir's fellow bandmates in the Grateful Dead back him on the album, and all but one of the songs became staples of the band's live shows.

Recording and release 
The album's origins were an offer by the Dead's Warner Bros. Records label to have band members cut their own solo records, and it came out the same year as Jerry Garcia's Garcia and Mickey Hart's Rolling Thunder. However, in the case of Ace, Weir's backing band was the Dead itself (minus Ron "Pigpen" McKernan), and all songs except "Walk in the Sunshine" became concert staples of the Dead.

The album is essentially a Grateful Dead recording in everything but name. In fact "Mexicali Blues" later appeared on the Grateful Dead album Skeletons from the Closet, and "One More Saturday Night" was first issued as a European single, in the guise of "Grateful Dead with Bobby Ace", to promote the band's then-imminent Europe '72 tour. Likewise, a live version of "Playing in the Band" had been released the previous year on Grateful Dead, having already been added to the band's repertoire. Dead bassist Phil Lesh explained "One by one we sidled into the studio, saying things like 'Bob, I really like that tunegot a bass player for it yet?' or 'Hey Bob, need some keyboards on that ballad?' Drawn in by the new songs, we eventually assembled the whole band (minus Pig, who was still trying to regain his health) at Wally Heider’s [studio] and finished the album in a burst of enthusiasm. Bob’s songwriting had taken a great leap forward".

Versions of "Greatest Story Ever Told" and "Playing in the Band" also appear on percussionist Mickey Hart's Rolling Thunder, as "The Pump Song" and "The Main Ten", respectively, both of which were also sung by Weir. The album initiated Weir's writing partnership with his old schoolmate from Wyoming, John Barlow, as lyricist.

Critical reception 
Reviewing in Christgau's Record Guide: Rock Albums of the Seventies (1981), Robert Christgau wrote: "Weir can be preachy and screechy, but Robert Hunter's homiletics ('Playing in the Band') make up for John Barlow's post-hippie know-nothingisms ('Walk in the Sunshine'), and 'One More Saturday Night' isn't any less a rockabilly epiphany because it strains Bobby's vocal chords—that just adds a note of authenticity. With Barlow redeeming himself on the elegiac pre-hippie fable 'Cassidy' and Keith Godchaux sounding like a cross between Chick Corea and Little Richard, this is the third in a series that began with Workingman's Dead and American Beauty."

Track listing

Personnel
Bob Weir – lead vocals, electric and acoustic guitars, production
Jerry Garcia – lead guitar, production; pedal steel guitar on "Looks Like Rain", backup vocals on "Greatest Story Ever Told"
Keith Godchaux – piano, organ, production
Bill Kreutzmann – drums, percussion, production
Phil Lesh – bass guitar, production; backup vocals on "Mexicali Blues"

Additional personnel
Ed Bogas – string arrangement on "Looks Like Rain"
Snooky Flowers, Luis Gasca and The Space Rangers – horns on "Black-Throated Wind", "Mexicali Blues" and "One More Saturday Night"
Donna Jean Godchaux – production; backup vocals on "Greatest Story Ever Told", "Walk in the Sunshine", "Playing in the Band" and "Cassidy"
Dave Torbert – bass guitar on "Greatest Story Ever Told"

References

1972 debut albums
Bob Weir albums
Grateful Dead
Grateful Dead Records albums
Warner Records albums
Albums recorded at Wally Heider Studios